Spathiphyllum is a genus of about 47 species of monocotyledonous flowering plants in the family Araceae, native to tropical regions of the Americas and southeastern Asia. Certain species of Spathiphyllum are commonly known as spath or peace lilies.

They are evergreen herbaceous perennial plants with large leaves 12–65 cm long and 3–25 cm broad. The flowers are produced in a spadix, surrounded by a 10–30 cm long, white, yellowish, or greenish spathe. The plant does not need large amounts of light or water to survive. They are most often grown as houseplants, however they are able to withstand the elements well enough to thrive when planted outdoors in situations that are hot and humid.

Etymology 
The more common name of peace lily derives from the plants symbolism for peace, purity, and healing, and has also been associated with the white flag, which is a signal for truce.

Selected species 
Species include:

 Spathiphyllum atrovirens
 Spathiphyllum bariense
 Spathiphyllum blandum
 Spathiphyllum brevirostre
 Spathiphyllum cannifolium
 Spathiphyllum cochlearispathum
 Spathiphyllum commutatum
 Spathiphyllum cuspidatum
 Spathiphyllum floribundum
 Spathiphyllum friedrichsthalii
 Spathiphyllum fulvovirens
 Spathiphyllum gardneri
 Spathiphyllum grandifolium
 Spathiphyllum jejunum
 Spathiphyllum juninense
 Spathiphyllum kalbreyeri
 Spathiphyllum kochii
 Spathiphyllum laeve
 Spathiphyllum lechlerianum
 Spathiphyllum maguirei
 Spathiphyllum mawarinumae
 Spathiphyllum monachinoi
 Spathiphyllum montanum
 Spathiphyllum neblinae
 Spathiphyllum ortgiesii
 Spathiphyllum patini
 Spathiphyllum perezii
 Spathiphyllum phryniifolium
 Spathiphyllum quindiuense
 Spathiphyllum silvicola
 Spathiphyllum solomonense
 Spathiphyllum wallisii
 Spathiphyllum wendlandii

Cultivated hybrids include:
Spathiphyllum × clevelandii

Cultivation and uses 
Several species are popular indoor houseplants. It lives best in shade and needs little sunlight to thrive, and is watered approximately once a week. The soil is best left moist but only needs watering if the soil is dry. The NASA Clean Air Study found that Spathiphyllum cleans certain gaseous environmental contaminants, including benzene and formaldehyde. However, subsequent tests have shown this cleaning effect is far too small to be practical.

The cultivar 'Mauna Loa' has won the Royal Horticultural Society's Award of Garden Merit.

Toxicity 
Although it is called a "lily", the peace lily is not a true lily from the family Liliaceae. True lilies are highly toxic (poisonous) to cats and dogs, but the peace lily, spathiphyllum is only mildly toxic to humans and other animals when ingested. It contains calcium oxalate crystals, which can cause skin irritation, a burning sensation in the mouth, difficulty swallowing, and nausea, but it does not contain the toxins found in true lilies, which could cause acute kidney failure in cats and some other animals.

In popular culture 
 The 7th track on Mother Earth's Plantasia, an early electronic album that was composed for plants to listen to, is "Swingin' Spathiphyllums".

 Simon Pegg's character PC Nicholas Angel in the movie Hot Fuzz has a peace lily that appears in several scenes and is referred to throughout the film. Angel's dedication to caring for the peace lily serves to symbolize his highly structured lifestyle and by-the-book approach to policing, which he abandons when he shatters the plant over the head of Michael "Lurch" Armstrong.

See also 
 Anthurium, similar looking genus of plants in same family
 List of plants known as lily

References

External links 

 Germplasm Resources Information Network: Spathiphyllum species list

 
Araceae genera